Mitchell Kisoor (born 6 November 1989) is a former Surinamese international footballer who played as a midfielder.

Kisoor scored three goals for the Suriname national football team during the 2017 Caribbean Cup qualification.

References

External links
Caribbean football database profile

1989 births
Living people
Surinamese footballers
Suriname international footballers
S.V. Robinhood players
Association football midfielders